The Southeastern United States, also referred to as the American Southeast or simply the Southeast, is a geographical region of the United States. It is located broadly on the eastern portion of the southern United States and the southern portion of the Eastern United States. It comprises at least a core of states on the lower East Coast of the United States and eastern Gulf Coast. Expansively, it reaches as far north as West Virginia and Maryland, which borders the Ohio River and Mason–Dixon line, . There is no official U.S. government definition of the region, though various agencies and departments use different definitions.

Geography
The United States Geological Survey defines Southeastern United States as including the states of Alabama, Florida, Georgia, Arkansas, Kentucky, Louisiana, Mississippi, North Carolina, South Carolina, and Tennessee, and Puerto Rico and the United States Virgin Islands.

There is no official United States Census Bureau definition of the southeastern United States. They instead divide a larger region which includes Texas, Oklahoma, Maryland, Delaware, Washington, D.C., Virginia, and West Virginia, designated as "the South," into three separate subregions, none of which are conventionally considered to define the Southeast.

The nonprofit American Association of Geographers defines the Southeastern United States as including Alabama, Florida, Georgia, Kentucky, Maryland, Mississippi, North Carolina, South Carolina, Tennessee, Virginia and West Virginia. The OSBO (Organization Supporting Business Owners) uses the same states, but includes Arkansas and Louisiana. The states of Delaware and Missouri, along with the U.S. capital of Washington, D.C., are also sometimes added in definitions of the term.

History

The history of human presence in the Southeast extends to before the dawn of civilization, to about 11,000 BC or 13,000 years ago. The earliest artifacts were from the Clovis culture. Before the arrival of Europeans, Native Americans of the Woodland period occupied the region for several hundred years.
 
The first Europeans to arrive in the region were conquistadors of the Spanish Empire. In 1541, Hernando de Soto journeyed through the southeast and crossed the Mississippi River. The region would host the first permanent European settlement in North America, with the Kingdom of England establishing Jamestown, Virginia in 1607. During Colonial America, the southeast states of Virginia, North Carolina, South Carolina and Georgia were among the Thirteen Colonies who helped form what would become the United States during the American Revolution.
 
During the American Civil War, the Confederate States of America consisted of the southeastern states of Florida, Alabama, Georgia, Mississippi, Tennessee, South Carolina, North Carolina, Virginia, Louisiana, and Arkansas. Texas was a Confederate State that isn't defined as part of the southeast region. Missouri, Kentucky, Maryland and Delaware were neutral border states that remained with the Union. West Virginia would split from Virginia during 1863, and also served as a border state that remained with the Union. Following the Reconstruction era in the 1870s, many Southeast state legislatures would pass Jim Crow laws. The American segregation era would span from the late 19th century to the mid-1960s.

In the mid-to-late 20th century, the Southeast saw many shifting changes take place population wise and economically. The Southeast started to see a spur of new economic growth in the 1930s, which stemmed from New Deal policies such as the Tennessee Valley Authority and the Fair Labor Standards Act instituting a minimum wage for the entire nation. World War II further helped growth within the Southeast, as military bases and military production drew workers from farming or low-wage industries into a new economy. With farming mechanization picking up to speed in the 1940s, promotion of different industries, and federal spending on defense and space programs, the Southeast would see further economic transformation in the ensuing years and decades of the 20th century.

The Southeast would benefit from its business and weather climate in its population growth during the late 20th century, as it helped in attracting job seekers and retirees from other U.S. regions. Florida in particular went from being the 27th most populated U.S. state in 1940 with 1.9 million residents, to being the 4th most populated U.S. state and having nearly 13 million residents in 2000. Southeast states such as North Carolina and Georgia saw large population growth increases as well during the late 20th century.

Demographics

Most populous states
The most populous states in the region as of the 2020 United States census are: Florida (21,538,187), followed by Georgia (10,711,908), and North Carolina (10,439,388).

U.S. territories

Puerto Rico and the U.S. Virgin Islands are located southeast of Florida, and are considered to be in the South / Southeastern U.S. by the FAA, Agricultural Research Service, and the U.S. National Park Service.

Largest cities

 

These are the largest cities in the Southeastern region of the United States by population, according to the United States Census Bureau in 2015:

 
|-
These are the metropolitan areas of the Southeastern region which exceed one million in population according to the United States Census Bureau's 2016 estimates:

Combined statistical areas
Beyond Megalopolis by Virginia Tech's Metropolitan Institute, an attempt to update Jean Gottmann's work with current trends, defines two "megapolitan areas" contained within the Southeast, out of a total of ten such areas in the United States:
"Piedmont" extending from North Carolina to Alabama
"Peninsula" covering South Florida and Central Florida
Two others tie some areas on the margins of the Southeast to urban centers in other regions:
"Gulf Coast" extending as far east as the western tip of Florida
"Northeast" including much of Maryland, Central Virginia, and Eastern Virginia.

These are the combined statistical areas of the Southeastern region which exceed 1  million in population according to the United States Census Bureau's 2016 estimates. Note that the metropolitan areas of Tampa and Richmond are not included in any CSAs, so they are included in the table without constituent areas.

Culture

The predominant culture of the Southeast U.S. has its origins with the settlement of the region by European colonists and African slaves during the 17th to 19th centuries, as large groups of English, Scottish, Scotch-Irish, Germans, Spanish, French, and Acadians migrated to the region. Since the late 20th century, the "New South" has emerged as the fastest-growing area of the United States economically. Multiculturalism has become more mainstream in the Southeastern states. African Americans remain a dominant demographic, at around 30% of the total population of the Southeast. The New South from a Southeastern standpoint, is largely built upon the metropolitan areas along the Interstate 85 (I-85) corridor. Cities along this corridor from north to south include Raleigh-Durham area, Greensboro, Charlotte, Spartanburg, Greenville, Atlanta, and Montgomery.

Climate
Most of the southeastern part of the United States is dominated by the humid subtropical climate (Cfa/Cwa). As one nears the southern portion of Florida, the climate gradually becomes tropical, as the winter season and all months have a mean temperature above  (the defined coldest monthly mean temperature of tropical climates).

Seasonally, summers are generally hot and humid throughout the entire region. The Bermuda High pumps hot and moist air mass from the tropical Atlantic Ocean and eastern Gulf of Mexico westward toward the southeast United States, creating the typical sultry tropical summers. Daytime highs are often in the upper 80s to lower 90s F. Rainfall is summer concentrated along the Gulf Coast and the South Atlantic coast from Norfolk, Virginia southward, reaching a sharp summer monsoon-like pattern over peninsular Florida, with dry winters and wet summers. Sunshine is abundant across the southeastern United States in summer, as the rainfall often comes in quick, but intense downpours. The mid-South, especially Tennessee, and the northern halves of Mississippi, Alabama, and Georgia, have maximum monthly rainfall amounts in winter and spring, owing to copious Gulf moisture and clashes between warm, moist air from the Gulf of Mexico and cold, dry air from Canada during the cold season. In this area, December, March, or April are typically the wettest months; August to October, the driest months (for example, in Tupelo, MS, Huntsville, AL and Memphis, TN).

Winters are cool in the northern areas like East Tennessee, Virginia, Maryland, and western North Carolina, with average highs in the  range in January. Farther south, winters become milder across interior eastern North and South Carolina, Georgia, and Alabama, with average January highs in the  range. Winters tend to be very dry and sunny across Florida, with a gradual increase in winter rainfall with increasing latitude, especially west of the Appalachian Mountains.

Economy

The Southeast economically has changed dramatically since the late 20th century. There has been a boom in its service economy, manufacturing base, high technology industries, and the financial sector. Examples of this include the surge in tourism in Florida and along the Gulf Coast; the numerous new automobile production plants such as Mercedes-Benz in Tuscaloosa; Hyundai in Montgomery; Toyota Motors in Blue Springs, Mississippi; Kia in West Point, Georgia; BMW production plant in Greer, South Carolina; Volkswagen in Chattanooga; GM manufacturing plant in Spring Hill, Tennessee; with the Nissan North American headquarters in Franklin, Tennessee; Mercedes-Benz USA; and Porsche North American headquarters in the Atlanta area; the two largest research parks in the country: Research Triangle Park in the Triangle area of North Carolina (the world's largest) and the Cummings Research Park in Huntsville, Alabama (the world's fourth largest); and the corporate headquarters of Verso Paper and FedEx in Memphis, Tennessee as well as the corporate headquarters of the Coca Cola Company, Delta Airlines, the Home Depot and United Parcel Service in Atlanta, Georgia. Dillards, along with Heifer International, is headquartered in Little Rock, Arkansas. Walmart is also headquartered in Arkansas.  
 
In 2020, Fortune 500 companies having headquarters in the Southeast region include: 22 in Virginia, 18 in Georgia, 18 in Florida, 13 in North Carolina, and 10 in Tennessee. This economic expansion has enabled parts of the South to have of some of the lowest unemployment rates in the United States. In Alabama, there is the large-scale manufacturing project owned by the German steel megacorporation ThyssenKrupp, which operates a massive, state-of-the-art facility in Mobile.

Even with certain states and areas in the Southeast doing well economically, many Southeast states and areas still have a high poverty rate when compared to the U.S. nationally. In 2017, seven Southeast states were in the top ten nationwide when it came to having the highest poverty rate.

Research and development areas
Research Triangle Park in the Raleigh–Durham urban area of North Carolina, has emerged as a major hub of technology, governmental, and biotechnological research and development. The Cummings Research Park in the Huntsville, Alabama area, is the second-largest research complex in the nation. Located in Huntsville is the Redstone Arsenal, United States Army Missile Command, the U.S. Space & Rocket Center, NASA's Marshall Space Flight Center and other key government, military, and aerospace agencies. Tullahoma, TN contains the Arnold Air Force Base. The base is home to the Arnold Engineering Development Complex (AEDC), the most advanced and largest complex of flight simulation test facilities in the world. 
 
The National High Magnetic Field Laboratory in Tallahassee, Florida, is the largest laboratory in the world devoted to the study of magnetism. The University of South Carolina is currently constructing a research campus in downtown Columbia, and the university is the nation's only National Science Foundation-funded Industry/University Cooperative Research Center for Fuel Cells.

Education

Higher education

The region includes a number of notable universities, public and private, whose research exert influence globally. Chief among public universities are:

There are a number of well-known private institutions, as well. Notable among these are:

The region is home to the greatest number of historically black colleges and universities in the nation. The three largest in the region are:

Sports

Professional

Although American football is prevalent across the United States, it is especially pervasive in the Southeast. There are nine National Football League (NFL) franchises across the region: Atlanta Falcons, Baltimore Ravens, Carolina Panthers, Jacksonville Jaguars, Miami Dolphins, New Orleans Saints, Tampa Bay Buccaneers, Tennessee Titans, and Washington Commanders. The NFL maintains a stronger commercial presence than any other major North American professional sports league.

The Southeast has seven National Basketball Association (NBA) franchises: Atlanta Hawks, Charlotte Hornets, Memphis Grizzlies, Miami Heat, New Orleans Pelicans, Orlando Magic, and Washington Wizards.

Major League Baseball (MLB) maintains six teams in the Southeast: Atlanta Braves, Baltimore Orioles, Miami Marlins, St. Louis Cardinals, Tampa Bay Rays, and Washington Nationals.

The Southeast has five National Hockey League (NHL) franchises: Carolina Hurricanes, Florida Panthers, Nashville Predators, Tampa Bay Lightning, and Washington Capitals.

Major League Soccer currently holds six clubs: Atlanta United FC, Charlotte FC, DC United, Inter Miami CF, Nashville SC and Orlando City SC.

The majority of NASCAR teams are headquartered in the Charlotte area along with the sports operations headquarters and media outlets. Tracks in the region include Atlanta Motor Speedway, Bristol Motor Speedway, Charlotte Motor Speedway, Darlington Raceway, Daytona International Speedway, Homestead-Miami Speedway, Martinsville Speedway, Nashville Superspeedway, North Wilkesboro Speedway, Richmond Raceway, and Talladega Superspeedway.

The southeast also hosts two of the three legs of the American Triple Crown: the Kentucky Derby in Louisville, and the Preakness Stakes in Baltimore. The Derby is considered the western leg of the crown and the Preakness is traditionally considered the southern leg.

College
The Atlantic Coast Conference is an NCAA Division I conference with many Southeastern college teams, including the: Clemson Tigers, Duke Blue Devils, Florida State Seminoles, Georgia Tech Yellow Jackets, Louisville Cardinals, Miami Hurricanes, North Carolina Tar Heels, NC State Wolfpack, Virginia Cavaliers, Virginia Tech Hokies, and Wake Forest Demon Deacons. 
 
The Southeastern Conference is also an NCAA Division I conference made up of Southeastern college teams, including the: Alabama Crimson Tide, Arkansas Razorbacks, Auburn Tigers, Florida Gators, Georgia Bulldogs, Kentucky Wildcats, LSU Tigers, Ole Miss Rebels, Mississippi State Bulldogs, Missouri Tigers, South Carolina Gamecocks, Tennessee Volunteers, Texas A&M Aggies, and Vanderbilt Commodores.

The Sugar Bowl, Orange Bowl, Peach Bowl, and Citrus Bowl are notable college football bowls held in Southeastern cities.

See also
Appalachia
Black Belt in the American South
Deep South
Hammock (ecology) – Southeastern habitat
Indigenous peoples of the Southeastern Woodlands
Southeastern conifer forests – Southeastern habitat
Southeastern mixed forests – Southeastern habitat
Upland South

References

Notes

External links

Flora Atlas of the Southeastern United States  – by the North Carolina Botanical Garden & University of North Carolina Herbarium (NCU).
Sea Level Changes in the Southeastern United States. Past, Present, and Future – University of South Florida (August 2011)

 
Eastern United States
Regions of the Southern United States
East Coast of the United States
S01